Guilestes acares is a mesonychid mesonychian mammal that lived during the late Eocene in southern China.  Fossils, primarily jaw fragments and teeth, are found in latest Eocene-aged strata from the Nado Formation, of Guansi.  It is similar in size to Dissacus and some of the smaller species of Yantanglestes (née "Lestes"), and differs from either by having no metaconids whatsoever on the trigonids of the lower molars, and a loss of M2.

References

External links
Organism Origins
Fossil Finder

Mesonychids
Eocene mammals
Fossils of China
Prehistoric placental genera